is a Japanese politician of the Liberal Democratic Party, a member of the House of Representatives in the Diet (national legislature). A native of Ise, Mie and graduate of the University of Tokyo, he joined the Ministry of Transport, attending Columbia University in the United States while in the ministry. He was elected to the House of Representatives for the first time in 2003.

References

External links 
 Official website in Japanese.

1950 births
Living people
People from Mie Prefecture
University of Tokyo alumni
Columbia University alumni
Members of the House of Representatives (Japan)
Liberal Democratic Party (Japan) politicians
21st-century Japanese politicians